The Best of The Bonzos is a compilation album of songs by The Bonzo Dog Band.

Track listing
Side one
 "Rockaliser Baby"
 "Jollity Farm"
 "Tent"
 "I'm the Urban Spaceman"
 "Can Blue Men Sing the Whites"
 "Karma Sutra"
 "I'm Bored"
 "Look at Me, I'm Wonderful""

Side two
"The Intro & the Outro"
 "Mr. Slater's Parrott"
 "Shirt"
 "Trouser Press"
 "Mickey's Son & Daughter"
 "You Done My Brain In"
 "The Sound of Music"
 "Canyons of Your Mind"

1970 greatest hits albums
Bonzo Dog Doo-Dah Band compilation albums
Albums produced by Gus Dudgeon
Liberty Records compilation albums
Albums produced by Gerry Bron
Albums produced by Neil Innes
Albums produced by Vivian Stanshall